Wretches & Jabberers is a 2010 American documentary film directed by Gerardine Wurzburg and produced by Wurzburg and Douglas Biklen that promotes the scientifically discredited facilitated communication technique. The film is about two autistic men, Larry Bissonnette and Tracy Thresher, who travel the world helping other autistic people break out of their isolation. It opened in theaters in New York and California on July 30, 2010.

The film has been criticized by multiple sources for promoting facilitated communication.  Skeptical Inquirer claims "it is clear that their facilitators are prompting them by touching an arm or shoulder as they type." As a review of the film in USA Today reports, psychology professor James Todd has agreed with skepticism towards the film by referring to facilitated communication as "the single most discredited intervention in the history of developmental disabilities", while Howard Shane, the Director of Communication Enhancement at Boston Children's Hospital, noted that many people with autism are able to type independently; accordingly "it is curious that those [in this film] being facilitated can only create these insightful comments" when aided by an assistant.  Former facilitator Janyce Boynton, a critic of facilitated communication, states that Wretches & Jabberers has become a promotional tool for facilitated communication.

See also 
 Rapid prompting method
Films
 Annie's Coming Out
 Autism Is a World
 Deej
Books
 The Reason I Jump
 Fall Down 7 Times Get Up 8

References

External links 
 
 

2010 films
Documentary films about autism
Films shot in Sri Lanka
2010 documentary films
Facilitated communication
2010s English-language films
Films about disability